Kikomachine Komix is a comic strip created by Filipino cartoonist and musician Manix Abrera. It was first published in Philippine Daily Inquirer in 2001 and has since appeared daily.

History 
During his days as a Fine Arts student in University of the Philippines-Diliman, Manix Abrera started to draw comics in 2000 for the Philippine Collegian, the official student newspaper of the university. He originally worked with two other fellow Fine Arts students on a comic strip entitled Garapata Blood (a Taglish phrase meaning "Tick Blood"). When space for more comics became available on the paper, Abrera worked on a solo project, which was Kikomachine.

The name "Kikomachine" was derived from Abrera's band of the same name ("Kiko Machine"), which was inspired by the character Kiko Matsing of the Filipino children's television shows Sesame! and Batibot.

A film adaptation of the comic strip is set to be made. In March 2018, Abrera signed a contract with Epik Studios, in cooperation with Viva Entertainment. In an interview with the Philippine Daily Inquirer, Abrera said that he will be involved with conceptualization and casting. The film's release date is yet to be determined.

References 

Philippine comic strips